The 2017 FIVB Volleyball World League was the 28th edition of the annual men's international volleyball tournament played by 36 teams between 2 June and 8 July. The Group 1 Final Round was held in Curitiba, Brazil.

In front of a crowd of 23,149 fans, France lifted the FIVB Volleyball World League trophy for the second time of their history, prevailing on an epic battle over hosts Brazil 3–2. This marked the fifth time in the last seven editions with Brazil reaching the final without successfully winning the gold medal. Canada wrapped up their best ever World League campaign by seizing the bronze medal (their first medal at an international FIVB event) after coming from behind for a 3–1 win over United States. Earvin N'Gapeth was elected the Most Valuable Player for the second time, after also being the MVP in 2015.

Slovenia defeated Japan in the Group 2 finals in Gold Coast, Australia to achieve their second straight group title since their debut last year (the team had previously won the Group 3 in 2016).

Moreover, Estonia finished atop of Group 3 at their first ever World League participation after a convincing 3–0 win over Spain in the final match in León, Mexico.

On 11 June 2017, the new one-set-score world record for national teams was established in the Group 3 intercontinental round match between Qatar and Venezuela. They spent 49 minutes in a 45–43 third set that was won by Qatar. The previous highest set score was 44–42, which had happened twice (in the 1999 FIVB Volleyball World League match between Canada and Brazil, and in the 2016 World Olympic Qualifying Tournament match between France and Australia).

Qualification
 and  qualified through the 2016 European League.

1 Teams making their debuts.

Format

Intercontinental round
Group 1, the 12 teams were drawn in 9 pools of 4 teams. In each pool, all teams will compete in round robin format. The results of all 9 pools will combine in 1 ranking table. The hosts and the top five ranked teams will play in the final round. The last ranked team after the Intercontinental Round could be relegated if the winners of the Group 2 Final Round can meet the promotion requirements set by the FIVB.
Group 2, the 12 teams were drawn in 9 pools of 4 teams. In each pool, all teams will compete in round robin format. The results of all 9 pools will combine in 1 ranking table. The hosts and the top three ranked teams will play in the final round. The last ranked team after the Intercontinental Round could be relegated if the winners of the Group 3 Final Round can meet the promotion requirements set by the FIVB.
Group 3, the 12 teams were drawn in 6 pools of 4 teams. In each pool, all teams will compete in round robin format. The results of all 6 pools will combine in 1 ranking table. The hosts and the top three ranked teams will play in the final round.

Final round
Group 1, the 6 teams in the final round will be divided in 2 pools determined by the serpentine system. The host team will be at the top position and the other teams will be allocated by their rankings in the preliminary round. The top 2 teams from each pool will play in the semifinals. The winning teams will play in the final match for the gold medals.
Group 2 and Group 3, the host team will face the last ranked team among the qualified teams in the semifinals. The other 2 teams will play against each other in the other semifinal. The winning teams will play in the final match for the gold medals and a chance for promotion.

Pools composition
The pools  were announced on 13 September 2016.

Group 1

Group 2

Group 3

Final round

Competition schedule

Squads

Pool standing procedure
 Number of matches won
 Match points
 Sets ratio
 Points ratio
 If the tie continues as per the point ratio between two teams, the priority will be given to the team which won the last match between them. When the tie in points ratio is between three or more teams, a new classification of these teams in the terms of points 1, 2 and 3 will be made taking into consideration only the matches in which they were opposed to each other.

Match won 3–0 or 3–1: 3 match points for the winner, 0 match points for the loser
Match won 3–2: 2 match points for the winner, 1 match point for the loser

Intercontinental round

Group 1

Ranking

|}

Week 1

Pool A1
Venue:  Adriatic Arena, Pesaro, Italy
All times are Central European Summer Time (UTC+02:00).

|}

Pool B1
Venue:  SPC Vojvodina, Novi Sad, Serbia
All times are Central European Summer Time (UTC+02:00).

|}

Pool C1
Venue:  Kazan Volleyball Centre, Kazan, Russia
All times are Moscow Time (UTC+03:00).

|}

Week 2

Pool D1
Venue:  Azadi Indoor Stadium, Tehran, Iran
All times are Iran Daylight Time (UTC+04:30).

|}

Pool E1
Venue:  Palace of Culture and Sports, Varna, Bulgaria
All times are Eastern European Summer Time (UTC+03:00).

|}

Pool F1
Venue:  Palais des Sports de Pau, Pau, France
All times are Central European Summer Time (UTC+02:00).

|}

Week 3

Pool G1
Venue:  Orfeo Superdomo, Córdoba, Argentina
All times are Argentina Time (UTC−03:00).

|}

Pool H1
Venues:  Spodek, Katowice, Poland (15 June) and  Atlas Arena, Łódź, Poland (17–18 June)
All times are Central European Summer Time (UTC+02:00).

|}

Pool I1
Venue:  Lotto Arena, Antwerp, Belgium
All times are Central European Summer Time (UTC+02:00).

|}

Group 2

Ranking

|}

Week 1

Pool A2
Venue:  Jangchung Arena, Seoul, South Korea
All times are Korea Standard Time (UTC+09:00).

|}

Pool B2
Venue:  Aréna Poprad, Poprad, Slovakia
All times are Central European Summer Time (UTC+02:00).

|}

Pool C2
Venue:  Başkent Volleyball Hall, Ankara, Turkey
All times are Turkey Time (UTC+03:00).

|}

Week 2

Pool D2
Venue:  Hartwall Arena, Helsinki, Finland
All times are Eastern European Summer Time (UTC+03:00).

|}

Pool E2
Venue:  Takasaki Arena, Takasaki, Japan
All times are Japan Standard Time (UTC+09:00).

|}

Pool F2
Venue:  Budvar Arena, České Budějovice, Czech Republic
All times are Central European Summer Time (UTC+02:00).

|}

Week 3

Pool G2
Venue:  Kunshan Sports Center Gymnasium, Kunshan, China
All times are China Standard Time (UTC+08:00).

|}

Pool H2
Venue:  Cairo Stadium Indoor Hall 2, Cairo, Egypt
All times are Eastern European Time (UTC+02:00).

|}

Pool I2
Venue:  Sportcampus Zuiderpark, The Hague, Netherlands
All times are Central European Summer Time (UTC+02:00).

|}

Group 3

Ranking

|}

Week 1

Pool A3
Venue:  Pavelló de la Vall d'Hebron, Barcelona, Spain
All times are Central European Summer Time (UTC+02:00).

|}

Pool B3
Venue:  Nikoljac Sports Center, Bijelo Polje, Montenegro
All times are Central European Summer Time (UTC+02:00).

|}

Pool C3
Venue:  Fraport Arena, Frankfurt, Germany
All times are Central European Summer Time (UTC+02:00).

|}

Week 2

Pool D3
Venue:  Kalevi Spordihall, Tallinn, Estonia
All times are Eastern European Summer Time (UTC+03:00).

|}

Pool E3
Venue:  El Menzah Sports Palace, Tunis, Tunisia
All times are West Africa Time (UTC+01:00).

|}

Pool F3
Venue:  TipsArena Linz, Linz, Austria
All times are Central European Summer Time (UTC+02:00).

|}

Final round

Group 3
Venue:  Domo de la Feria, León, Mexico
All times are Central Daylight Time (UTC−05:00).

Final four (Week 3)

Semifinals

|}

3rd place match

|}

Final

|}

Group 2
Venue:  Carrara Indoor Stadium, Gold Coast, Australia
All times are Australian Eastern Standard Time (UTC+10:00).

Final four (Week 4)

Semifinals

|}

3rd place match

|}

Final

|}

Group 1
Venue:  Arena da Baixada, Curitiba, Brazil
All times are Brasília Time (UTC−03:00).

Pool play (Week 6)

Pool J1

|}

|}

Pool K1

|}

|}

Final four (Week 6)

Semifinals

|}

3rd place match

|}

Final

|}

Final standing

Awards

Most Valuable Player
 Earvin N'Gapeth
Best Setter
 Benjamin Toniutti
Best Outside Spikers
 Ricardo Lucarelli
 Earvin N'Gapeth

Best Middle Blockers
 Graham Vigrass
 Kévin Le Roux
Best Opposite Spiker
 Wallace de Souza
Best Libero
 Blair Bann

Statistics leaders
The statistics of each group follows the vis reports P2 and P3. The statistics include 6 volleyball skills; serve, recept, set, spike, block, and dig. The table below shows the top 5 ranked players in each skill by group plus top scorers as of 24 June 2017.

Best scorers
Best scorers determined by scored points from spike, block and serve.

Best spikers
Best spikers determined by successful spikes in percentage.

Best blockers
Best blockers determined by the average of stuff blocks per set.

Best servers
Best servers determined by the average of aces per set.

Best setters
Best setters determined by the average of running sets per set.

Best diggers
Best diggers determined by the average of successful digs per set.

Best receivers
Best receivers determined by efficient receptions in percentage.

See also
2017 FIVB Volleyball World Grand Prix

References

External links
Fédération Internationale de Volleyball – official website
2017 FIVB Volleyball World League – official website
Media Guide – Introduction and Tournament History at 2017 FIVB Volleyball World League
Media Guide – Preview and Competition Information at 2017 FIVB Volleyball World League
Media Guide – Team Information and Players statistics at 2017 FIVB Volleyball World League
Media Guide – Referees at 2017 FIVB Volleyball World League
Media Guide – Tournaments Records and History World Ranking at 2017 FIVB Volleyball World League
Media Guide – Historical Information at 2017 FIVB Volleyball World League
Media Guide – Media Information at 2017 FIVB Volleyball World League

2017
FIVB World League
International volleyball competitions hosted by Brazil
2017 in Brazilian sport
Volleyball World League
Volleyball World League
Sport in Curitiba
21st century in Curitiba